Lichenomphalia cinereispinula is a species of basidiolichen in the family Hygrophoraceae. Found in Europe, it was described as a new species in 2009 by Pierre Neville and Francis Fouchier.

The lichen makes a slender mushroom-like fruiting body with a stipe length about three to five times the diameter of the cap. The convex to sub-hemispherical gray cap measures  and has slight radial "ribs". There are 10 gills and 7 short gills (lamellulae) on the cap underside that are distantly spaced and dull whitish in colour. The thin cylindrical stipe is pruinose with a somewhat bulbous base. There are greenish glomerules at the stipe base, indicating a lichen thallus of the Botrydina type. Basidiospores are smooth, inamyloid, hyaline, and ellipsoid in shape, and have dimensions of 5.3–7.7 by 3.0–4.4 μm.

Lichenomphalia cinereispinula fruits in autumn in Mediterranean climate in the south of France.

References

Hygrophoraceae
Lichen species
Lichens described in 2009
Lichens of Southwestern Europe
Basidiolichens